Sangram Singh II (24 March 1690 – 11 January 1734) was a ruler of Mewar, India. He reigned from 1710 to 1734. He was succeeded by his son Jagat Singh II.

Maharana Sangram Singh II was a great ruler of his time. He ascended the throne at a crucial juncture in Indian history when the Mughal Empire was disintegrating and dividing into various independent parts with several announcing themselves free from the Mughal rule. At the same time Mewar was facing internal feuds because of which their chance to expand their territory was also minimal. This scenario led Mewar into a defensive state of mode against the Mughal which was later abolished with gradual fall of Mughal Empire. But with the continuous upsurge of Marathas at the same time, the Rajputs continued with their fortification to safeguard and strengthen their territory.

Battle of Bandanwara
Soon after his accession, Mewar faced invasion by Ranbaz Khan Mewati in 1711 AD, who was granted the pargana of Pur Mandal by the Mughals, which were under control of Mewar. Sangram Singh-II sent a large army to face him. Mewar forces faced Ranbaz Khan near Khari river. The battle is known as Battle of Bandanwara, in which Ranbaz Khan was defeated and killed.

Later regin
During this time in the Indian history, Maharana Sangram Singh II wisely reigned Mewar to a prosperous and peaceful province. He was cautious of the needs of his countrymen and steadily steered Mewar towards efficient financial and state affairs. During his rule, the Sisodia dynasty branched into three sections with his sons heading each section and establishing growth of Mewar everywhere. Emperor Farukhsiyar, the Mughal ruler during his reign, granted him his own coinage. Art and craft of Mewar re-flourished under him with peace and prosperity. He recaptured various lost territories of Mewar expanding his kingdom.

Leading his kingdom towards opulence, his death marked the downslide of Rajputana rule along with the decline of the Mughal Empire and the emergence of the Maratha power during the reign of his successor Maharana Jagat Singh II.

References 

Mewar dynasty
1690 births
1734 deaths